Floros Nicolaou (born 12 September 1962) is a retired Cypriot football striker.

References

1962 births
Living people
Cypriot footballers
Nea Salamis Famagusta FC players
Pezoporikos Larnaca players
APOEL FC players
Association football forwards
Cyprus international footballers
Cypriot football managers
AEK Larnaca FC managers
Nea Salamis Famagusta FC managers